is a Japanese professional golfer.

Deguchi played on the Japan Golf Tour, winning five times.

Professional wins (5)

Japan Golf Tour wins (5)

Team appearances
World Cup (representing Japan): 1984

External links

Japanese male golfers
Japan Golf Tour golfers
Sportspeople from Mie Prefecture
1948 births
Living people